Mehmad Chak (Urdu: مهمندچک) is a village in Tehsil Kharian, in the Gujrat District of Punjab, Pakistan. It is located at 32°47'N 73°49.4'E at an altitude of 900 feet. Mainly people of the Jutt tribe live there.

Populated places in Gujrat District